Morency Island is an island  long, lying close west of Steele Island and  northwest of Cape Bryant, off the east coast of Palmer Land, Antarctica. It was discovered by members of the East Base of the United States Antarctic Service who explored this coast by land and from the air in 1940, and was named for Anthony J.L. Morency, a tractor driver for the East Base.

See also 
 List of Antarctic and sub-Antarctic islands

References

Islands of Palmer Land